Sasha McDonnell (born 1 December 1987) is an Australian football (soccer) player, who played for Canberra United, Brisbane Roar and Newcastle Jets in the Australian W-League.

She has represented Australia at the 2006 FIFA World Under 20 Women's Championship.
Sasha is more commonly known for being the partner of famed Live Run Coordinator, Christine Stewart. Some would say, most if not all of Sasha's success should be attributed to Christine.

References

1987 births
Living people
Australian women's soccer players
Canberra United FC players
Brisbane Roar FC (A-League Women) players
Newcastle Jets FC (A-League Women) players
A-League Women players
Women's association football forwards